The 2012–13 Fairleigh Dickinson Knights men's basketball team represented Fairleigh Dickinson University during the 2012–13 NCAA Division I men's basketball season. The Knights, led by fourth year head coach Greg Vetrone, played their home games at the Rothman Center and were members of the Northeast Conference. They finished the season 7–24, 2–16 in NEC play to finish in last place. They failed to qualify for the Northeast Conference tournament.

Following the season, head coach Greg Vetrone's contract was not renewed. His overall record was 26–95 and just 16–55 in NEC play.

Roster

Schedule

|-
!colspan=9| Regular season

References

Fairleigh Dickinson Knights men's basketball seasons
Fairleigh Dickinson
Fairleigh Dickinson Knights men's b
Fairleigh Dickinson Knights men's b